WFC Krasnodar is the women's team of Russian football club FC Krasnodar. The club was established on 4 February 2020 and will participate in the Russian Women's Football Championship, the top division of Russian women football.

History 
The club was formed by FC Krasnodar with support from the government of Krasnodar Krai to replace Kubanochka Krasnodar, which was dissolved in February 2020.

Players

Current squad
.

Former players

References

External links 

Women's football clubs in Russia
Association football clubs established in 2020
FC Krasnodar
2020 establishments in Russia